The Bowyer baronetcy, of Knipersley in the County of Stafford, was created in the Baronetage of England in 1660 for John Bowyer. He sat as Member of Parliament for Staffordshire and Newcastle-under-Lyme. His elder son, the second Baronet, represented Warwick and Staffordshire in the House of Commons. His son, the third Baronet, died childless and was succeeded by his uncle, the fourth Baronet. On the latter's death in 1701 without surviving male issue the title became extinct.

Bowyer baronets, of Knipersley, Staffordshire (1660)
Sir John Bowyer, 1st Baronet (1623–1666)
Sir John Bowyer, 2nd Baronet (1653–1691)
Sir John Bowyer, 3rd Baronet (1672–1701)
Sir William Bowyer, 4th Baronet (1654–1702)

See also
 Bowyer baronets

Notes

Extinct baronetcies in the Baronetage of England
1660 establishments in England